Veggie Victory is the first vegetarian restaurant in Nigeria.

History
Veggie Victory was established by Hakeem Jimo in 2013. It was first located at Freedom Park, Lagos Island, and is now at Dolphin Estate in Ikoyi, Lagos. VeggieVictory serves strictly Vegan Nigerian and Vegan International cuisine: including fresh, hot, spicy local and West African delicacies. VeggieVictory uses meat substitutes like VegChunks (seitan), tofu and mushrooms for their Veggie burgers, soy dogs, egusi and eforiro stews.

See also
List of vegetarian restaurants
List of restaurants in Lagos

References

2013 establishments in Nigeria
Restaurants established in 2013
Restaurants in Lagos
Vegetarian restaurants in Nigeria